In Greek mythology Phrixus (also spelt Phryxus; , Phrixos means "standing on end, bristling") was the son of Athamas, king of Boeotia, and Nephele (a goddess of clouds). He was the twin brother of Helle and the father of Argus, Phrontis, Melas and Cytisorus by Chalciope (Iophassa), daughter of Aeetes, king of Colchis.

Mythology 
Phrixus and Helle (also known as Ellie) were hated by their stepmother, Ino. She hatched a devious plot to get rid of the twins, roasting all of Boeotia's crop seeds so they would not grow. The local farmers, frightened of famine, asked a nearby oracle for assistance. Ino bribed the men sent to the oracle to lie and tell the others that the oracle required the sacrifice of Phrixus and Helle. Before they were killed, though, Phrixus and Helle were rescued by a flying, or swimming, ram with golden wool sent by Nephele, their natural mother; their starting point is variously recorded as Halos in Thessaly and Orchomenus in Boeotia. During their flight Helle, for unknown reasons, fell off the ram and drowned in the strait between Europe and Asia, which was named after her the Hellespont, meaning the sea of Helle (now Dardanelles); Phrixus survived all the way to Colchis, where King Aeëtes, the son of the sun god Helios, took him in and treated him kindly, giving Phrixus his daughter, Chalciope, in marriage. In gratitude, Phrixus sacrificed the ram to Poseidon and gave the king the Golden Fleece of the ram, which Aeëtes hung in a tree in the holy grove of Ares in his kingdom, guarded by a dragon that never slept. Phrixus and Chalciope had four sons, who later joined forces with the Argonauts. The oldest was Argos/ Argus, Phrontis, Melas, and Cytisorus.

Phrixus thus lived at the court of Aeëtes but one day Aeëtes learned from an oracle that he would die at the hands of a descendant of Aeolus and so he killed Phrixus. However, other sources claim that Phrixus lived peacefully at Colchis and died of old age.

Notes

References 
Apollodorus, The Library with an English Translation by Sir James George Frazer, F.B.A., F.R.S. in 2 Volumes, Cambridge, MA, Harvard University Press; London, William Heinemann Ltd. 1921. ISBN 0-674-99135-4. Online version at the Perseus Digital Library. Greek text available from the same website. 
Apollonius Rhodius, Argonautica translated by Robert Cooper Seaton (1853-1915), R. C. Loeb Classical Library Volume 001. London, William Heinemann Ltd, 1912. Online version at the Topos Text Project.
Pseudo-Eratosthenes, Catasterismi 14, 19
Gaius Julius Hyginus, Fabulae from The Myths of Hyginus translated and edited by Mary Grant. University of Kansas Publications in Humanistic Studies. Online version at the Topos Text Project. 
Hyginus, Fabulae 1–3, 12, 21, 22, 188
Gaius Valerius Flaccus, 1.281ff
Gaius Valerius Flaccus, Argonautica translated by Mozley, J H. Loeb Classical Library Volume 286. Cambridge, MA, Harvard University Press; London, William Heinemann Ltd. 1928. Online version at theio.com.
Gaius Valerius Flaccus, Argonauticon. Otto Kramer. Leipzig. Teubner. 1913. Latin text available at the Perseus Digital Library.
Ovid, Metamorphoses 7.8ff, Fasti 3.867ff
Publius Ovidius Naso, Metamorphoses translated by Brookes More (1859-1942). Boston, Cornhill Publishing Co. 1922. Online version at the Perseus Digital Library.
Publius Ovidius Naso, Metamorphoses. Hugo Magnus. Gotha (Germany). Friedr. Andr. Perthes. 1892. Latin text available at the Perseus Digital Library.
Palaephatus, Incredibilia 30

Princes in Greek mythology
Family of Athamas
Boeotian characters in Greek mythology
Colchis in mythology